Matteo Cornelli (Piacenza, 6 June 1995) is an Italian rugby union player. His usual position is as a Flanker and he currently plays for Fiamme Oro in Top12.

In 2016–17 Pro12 season, he was named Additional Player for Zebre.

After playing for Italy Under 20 in 2014 and 2015, in 2018 Cornelli also was named in the Emerging Italy squad.

References

External links 
It's Rugby England Profile
Ultimate Rugby Profile

Italian rugby union players
Sportspeople from Piacenza
1995 births
Living people
Rugby union flankers
Rugby Lyons Piacenza players
Fiamme Oro Rugby players